Moon Jeong-hee (born January 12, 1976) is a South Korean stage, film, and television actress. She has won Blue Dragon Film Award for Best Supporting Actress for her performance in Deranged (2012) and Best Supporting Actress award in Buil Film Awards for her performance in Cart (2014).

Career
Moon Jeong-hee graduated from the Korea National University of Arts with a degree in Theatre Studies. She made her theater debut in a 1998 staging of Blood Brothers.

Though she hasn't found full-fledged stardom, the actress has built a solid body of work alternating leading and supporting roles. 2012 hit Deranged was her first starring role in a commercial film, for which she won Best Supporting Actress at the Blue Dragon Film Awards. Moon has also drawn positive reviews for her performances in Hide and Seek (2013), Cart (2014), and Mama (2014).

Other activities
Having learned salsa in middle school, Moon became an accomplished salsa dancer. She has worked as a salsa dancing teacher in between projects, and can also do jazz dancing and the pansori.

Moon is fluent in three languages - Korean, English and French. She was named the goodwill ambassador of international children's rights group Safe Kids Korea in 2010. In 2012 she hosted the closing ceremony of the Jeonju International Film Festival.

In 2021, she was selected as jury member for Bucheon Choice Features section of 25th Bucheon International Fantastic Film Festival held in July.

Filmography

Film

Television drama

Web series

Variety show

Theater

Awards and nominations

References

External links

 
 Moon Jeong-hee at Prain TPC
 
 
 
 

South Korean film actresses
South Korean television actresses
South Korean stage actresses
Korea National University of Arts alumni
Living people
1976 births
20th-century South Korean actresses
21st-century South Korean actresses